Gorgonidia garleppi is a moth of the family Erebidae first described by Herbert Druce in 1898. It is found in Bolivia and Peru.

References

Phaegopterina
Moths described in 1898